Beech Bluff is an unincorporated community on the east-central edge of Madison County, Tennessee, United States. The area ZIP code is 38313.

History
The area which is now Beech Bluff was first inhabited by the Chickasaw, from whom an earthwork remains. In 1852, a post office was established at Beech Bluff, which was then also known as Homer and used as a summer resort. After a section of the Tennessee Midland Railway was built through the area between 1888 and 1890, the name of the community was officially settled as Beech Bluff, deriving its appellation from a large grove of native beech trees near a local bluff. By 1897, the population had grown to approximately three hundred. The community was historically home to a high school, founded as a one-room schoolhouse in 1885 and closed  during desegregation in 1977. It later became a grade school called Beech Bluff Elementary before it was converted into a recreation center in 2016.

Geography
Beech Bluff is built on deposits of loess which have developed brown or grayish brown silt loam soils. These are mapped as Grenada, Memphis or Lexington series where drainage is good, and Calloway in somewhat poorly drained areas.

Demographics

References

Notes

Citations

Unincorporated communities in Madison County, Tennessee
Unincorporated communities in Tennessee